Hoboken is a city in Hudson County in the U.S. state of New Jersey. Hoboken is part of the New York metropolitan area and is the site of Hoboken Terminal, a major transportation hub for the tri-state region. As of the 2020 United States census, the city's population was 60,419, an increase of 10,414 (+20.8%) from the 2010 census count of 50,005, which in turn reflected an increase of 11,428 (+29.6%) from the 38,577 counted in the 2000 census. The Census Bureau's Population Estimates Program calculated that the city's population was 58,690 in 2021, ranking the city as the 668th-most-populous in the country.

Hoboken was first settled by Europeans as part of the Pavonia, New Netherland colony in the 17th century. During the early 19th century, the city was developed by Colonel John Stevens, first as a resort and later as a residential neighborhood. Originally part of Bergen Township and later North Bergen Township, it became a separate township in 1849 and was incorporated as a city in 1855. Hoboken is the location of the first recorded game of baseball and of the Stevens Institute of Technology, one of the oldest technological universities in the United States. It is also known as the birthplace and hometown of Frank Sinatra; various streets and parks in the city have been named after him.

Located on the Hudson Waterfront, the city was an integral part of the Port of New York and New Jersey and was home to major industries for most of the 20th century. The character of the city has changed from an artsy industrial vibe from the days when Maxwell House coffee, Lipton tea, Hostess Cupcakes, and Wonder Bread called Hoboken home, to one of trendy shops and expensive condominiums. It was ranked 2nd in Niche's "2019 Best Places to Live in Hudson County" list. and in 2022, it was ranked 1st on that list.

History

Etymology
The name Hoboken was chosen by Colonel John Stevens when he bought land, on a part of which the city still sits. The Lenape, later called Delaware Indian tribe of Native Americans, referred to the area as the "land of the tobacco pipe", most likely to refer to the soapstone collected there to carve tobacco pipes, and used a phrase that became "Hopoghan Hackingh". Like Weehawken, its neighbor to the north, Communipaw and Harsimus to the south, Hoboken had many variations in the folks-tongue. Hoebuck, old Dutch for high bluff and likely referring to Castle Point, the district of the city highest above sea level, was used during the colonial era and later spelled as Hobuck, Hobock, Hobuk and Hoboocken. However, in the nineteenth century, the name was changed to Hoboken, influenced by Flemish Dutch immigrants and a folk etymology had emerged linking the town of Hoboken to the similarly-named Hoboken district of Antwerp.

During the late 19th/early 20th century the population and culture of Hoboken was dominated by German language speakers who sometimes called it "Little Bremen", many of whom are buried in Hoboken Cemetery, North Bergen.

Early-European arrival and colonial period

Hoboken was originally an island which was surrounded by the Hudson River on the east and tidal lands at the foot of the New Jersey Palisades on the west. It was a seasonal campsite in the territory of the Hackensack, a phratry of the Lenni Lenape, who used the serpentine rock found there to carve pipes.

The first recorded European to lay claim to the area was Henry Hudson, an Englishman sailing for the Dutch East India Company, who anchored his ship the Halve Maen (Half Moon) at Weehawken Cove on October 2, 1609. Soon after it became part of the province of New Netherland.

In 1630, Michael Reyniersz Pauw, a burgemeester (mayor) of Amsterdam and a director of the Dutch West India Company, received a land grant as patroon on the condition that he would plant a colony of not fewer than fifty persons within four years on the west bank of what had been named the North River. Three Lenape sold the land that became Hoboken and part of Jersey City for 80 fathoms (146 m) of wampum, 20 fathoms (37 m) of cloth, 12 kettles, six guns, two blankets, one double kettle, and half a barrel of beer. These transactions, variously dated as July 12, 1630 and November 22, 1630, represent the earliest known conveyance for the area. Pauw, whose Latinized name is Pavonia, failed to settle the land, and he was obliged to sell his holdings back to the company in 1633.

It was later acquired by Hendrick Van Vorst, who leased part of the land to Aert Van Putten, a farmer. In 1643, north of what would be later known as Castle Point, Van Putten built a house and a brewery, North America's first. In series of Indian and Dutch raids and reprisals, Van Putten was killed and his buildings destroyed, and all residents of Pavonia, as the colony was then known, were ordered back to New Amsterdam. Deteriorating relations with the Lenape, its isolation as an island, or relatively long distance from New Amsterdam may have discouraged more settlement.

In 1664, the English took possession of New Amsterdam with little to no resistance, and in 1668 they confirmed a previous land patent by Nicolas Verlett. In 1674–1675, the area became part of East Jersey, and the province was divided into four administrative districts, Hoboken becoming part of Bergen County, where it remained until the creation of Hudson County on February 22, 1840. English-speaking settlers (some relocating from New England) interspersed with the Dutch, but it remained sparsely populated and agrarian.

Eventually, the land came into the possession of William Bayard, who originally supported the revolutionary cause, but became a Loyalist Tory after the fall of New York in 1776 when the city and surrounding areas, including the west bank of the renamed Hudson River, were occupied by the British. At the end of the Revolutionary War, Bayard's property was confiscated by the Revolutionary Government of New Jersey. In 1784, the land described as "William Bayard's farm at Hoebuck" was bought at auction by Colonel John Stevens for £18,360 (then $90,000).

19th century

In the early 19th century, Colonel John Stevens developed the waterfront as a resort for Manhattanites. On October 11, 1811, Stevens' ship the Juliana, began to operate as a ferry between Manhattan and Hoboken, making it the world's first commercial steam ferry. In 1825, he designed and built a steam locomotive capable of hauling several passenger cars at his estate. Sybil's Cave, a cave with a natural spring, was opened in 1832 and visitors came to pay a penny for a glass of water from the cave which was said to have medicinal powers. In 1841, the cave became a legend, when Edgar Allan Poe wrote "The Mystery of Marie Roget" about an event that took place there. The cave was closed in the late 1880s after the water was found to be contaminated, and it was shut and in the 1930s and filled with concrete, before it was reopened in 2008. Before his death in 1838, Stevens founded the Hoboken Land and Improvement Company, which laid out a regular system of streets, blocks and lots, constructed housing, and developed manufacturing sites. In general, the housing consisted of masonry row houses of three to five stories, some of which survive to the present day, as does the street grid.

Hoboken was originally formed as a township on April 9, 1849, from portions of North Bergen Township. As the town grew in population and employment, many of Hoboken's residents saw a need to incorporate as a full-fledged city, and in a referendum held on March 29, 1855, ratified an Act of the New Jersey Legislature signed the previous day, and the City of Hoboken was born. In the subsequent election, Cornelius V. Clickener became Hoboken's first mayor. On March 15, 1859, the Township of Weehawken was created from portions of Hoboken and North Bergen Township.

Based on a bequest from Edwin A. Stevens, Stevens Institute of Technology was founded at Castle Point in 1870, at the site of the Stevens family's former estate, as the nation's first mechanical engineering college. By the late 19th century, shipping lines were using Hoboken as a terminal port, and the Delaware, Lackawanna & Western Railroad (later the Erie Lackawanna Railroad) developed a railroad terminal at the waterfront, with the present NJ Transit terminal designed by architect Kenneth Murchison constructed in 1907. It was also during this time that German immigrants, who had been settling in town during most of the century, became the predominant population group in the city, at least partially due to its being a major destination port of the Hamburg America Line, though anti-German sentiment during World War I led to a rapid decline in the German community. In addition to the primary industry of shipbuilding, Hoboken became home to Keuffel and Esser's three-story factory and in 1884, to Tietjen and Lang Drydock (later Todd Shipyards). Well-known companies that developed a major presence in Hoboken after the turn-of the-century included Maxwell House, Lipton Tea, and Hostess.

Birthplace of baseball

The first officially recorded game of baseball took place in Hoboken in 1846 between Knickerbocker Club and New York Nine at Elysian Fields. In 1845, the Knickerbocker Club, which had been founded by Alexander Cartwright, began using Elysian Fields to play baseball due to the lack of suitable grounds on Manhattan. Team members included players of the St George's Cricket Club, the brothers Harry and George Wright, and Henry Chadwick, the English-born journalist who coined the term "America's Pastime".

By the 1850s, several Manhattan-based members of the National Association of Base Ball Players were using the grounds as their home field while St. George's continued to organize international matches between Canada, England and the United States at the same venue. In 1859, George Parr's All England Eleven of professional cricketers played the United States XXII at Hoboken, easily defeating the local competition. Sam Wright and his sons Harry and George Wright played on the defeated United States team, a loss which inadvertently encouraged local players to take up baseball. Henry Chadwick believed that baseball and not cricket should become the national pastime after the game drawing the conclusion that amateur American players did not have the leisure time required to develop cricket skills to the high technical level required of professional players. Harry Wright and George Wright then became two of the first professional baseball players in the United States when Aaron Champion raised funds to found the Cincinnati Red Stockings in 1869.

In 1865, the grounds hosted a championship match between the Mutual Club of New York City and the Atlantic Club of Brooklyn that was attended by an estimated 20,000 fans and captured in the Currier & Ives lithograph "The American National Game of Base Ball".

With the construction of two significant baseball parks enclosed by fences in Brooklyn, enabling promoters there to charge admission to games, the prominence of Elysian Fields diminished. In 1868 the leading Manhattan club, Mutual, shifted its home games to the Union Grounds in Brooklyn. In 1880, the founders of the New York Metropolitans and New York Giants finally succeeded in siting a ballpark in Manhattan that became known as the Polo Grounds.

20th century

Few nonwhites had settled in Hoboken by 1901. The Brooklyn Eagle claimed that an unwritten sundown town policy prevented African Americans from residing or working there.

World War I

When the U.S. entered World War I, the Hamburg-American Line piers in Hoboken and New Orleans were taken under eminent domain. Federal control of the port and anti-German sentiment led to part of the city being placed under martial law, and many German immigrants were forcibly moved to Ellis Island or left the city of their own accord. Hoboken became the major point of embarkation and more than three million soldiers, known as "doughboys", passed through the city. Their hope for an early return led to General Pershing's slogan, "Heaven, Hell or Hoboken... by Christmas."

Following the war, Italians, mostly stemming from the Adriatic port city of Molfetta, became the city's major ethnic group, with the Irish also having a strong presence. While the city experienced the Great Depression, jobs in the ships yards and factories were still available, and the tenements were bustling. Middle-European Jews, mostly German-speaking, also made their way to the city and established small businesses. The Port Authority of New York and New Jersey, which was established on April 30, 1921, oversaw the development of the Holland Tunnel (completed in 1927) and the Lincoln Tunnel (in 1937), allowing for easier vehicular travel between New Jersey and New York City, bypassing the waterfront.

Post-World War II

The war facilitated economic growth in Hoboken, as the many industries located in the city were crucial to the war effort. As men went off to battle, more women were hired in the factories, some (most notably, Todd Shipyards), offering classes and other incentives to them. Though some returning service men took advantage of GI housing bills, many with strong ethnic and familial ties chose to stay in town. During the 1950s, the economy was still driven by Todd Shipyards, Maxwell House, Lipton Tea, Hostess and Bethlehem Steel and companies with big plants were still not inclined to invest in major infrastructure elsewhere.

In the 1960s, working pay and conditions began to deteriorate: turn-of-the century housing started to look shabby and feel crowded, shipbuilding was cheaper overseas, and single-story plants surrounded by parking lots made manufacturing and distribution more economical than old brick buildings on congested urban streets. The city appeared to be in the throes of inexorable decline as industries sought (what had been) greener pastures, port operations shifted to larger facilities on Newark Bay, and the car, truck and plane displaced the railroad and ship as the transportation modes of choice in the United States. Many Hobokenites headed to the suburbs, often the close by ones in Bergen and Passaic Counties, and real-estate values declined. Hoboken sank from its earlier incarnation as a lively port town into a rundown condition and was often included in lists with other New Jersey cities experiencing the same phenomenon, such as Paterson, Elizabeth, Camden, and neighboring Jersey City.

The old economic underpinnings were gone and nothing new seemed to be on the horizon. Attempts were made to stabilize the population by demolishing the so-called slums along River Street and build subsidized middle-income housing at Marineview Plaza, and in midtown, at Church Towers. Heaps of long uncollected garbage and roving packs of semi-wild dogs were not uncommon sights. Though the city had seen better days, Hoboken was never abandoned. New infusions of immigrants, most notably Puerto Ricans, kept the storefronts open with small businesses and housing stock from being abandoned, but there wasn't much work to be had. Washington Street, commonly called "the avenue", was never boarded up, and the tight-knit neighborhoods remained home to many who were still proud of their city. Stevens remained a premier technology school, Maxwell House kept chugging away, and Bethlehem Steel still housed sailors who were dry-docked on its piers. Italian-Americans and other came back to the "old neighborhood" to shop for delicatessen.

In 1975, the western part of the Keuffel and Esser Manufacturing Complex (known as "Clock Towers") was converted into residential apartments, after having been an architectural, engineering and drafting facility from 1907 to 1968; the eastern part portion became residential apartments in 1984 (now called the  Grand Adams).

Waterfront

The Hudson Waterfront defined Hoboken as an archetypal port town and powered its economy from the mid-19th to mid-20th century, by which time it had become essentially industrial (and mostly inaccessible to the general public). The large production plants of Lipton Tea and Maxwell House, and the drydocks of Bethlehem Shipbuilding Corporation and Todd Shipbuilding dominated the northern portion for many years. On June 30, 1900, a large fire at the Norddeutscher Lloyd piers killed numerous people and caused almost $10 million in damage. The southern portion (which had been a U.S. base of the Hamburg-American Line) was seized by the federal government under eminent domain at the outbreak of World War I, after which it became (with the rest of the Hudson County) a major East Coast cargo-shipping port.

With the development of the Interstate Highway System and containerization shipping facilities (particularly at Port Newark-Elizabeth Marine Terminal), the docks became obsolete, and by the 1970s were more or less abandoned. A large swath of River Street, known as the Barbary Coast for its taverns and boarding houses (which had been home for many dockworkers, sailors, merchant mariners, and other seamen) was leveled as part of an urban renewal project. Though control of the confiscated area had been returned to the city in the 1950s, complex lease agreements with the Port Authority gave it little influence on its management. In the 1980s, the waterfront dominated Hoboken politics, with various civic groups and the city government engaging in sometimes nasty, sometimes absurd politics and court cases. By the 1990s, agreements were made with the Port Authority of New York and New Jersey, various levels of government, Hoboken citizens, and private developers to build commercial and residential buildings and "open spaces" (mostly along the bulkhead and on the foundation of un-utilized Pier A).

The northern portion, which had remained in private hands, has also been re-developed. While most of the dry-dock and production facilities were razed to make way for mid-rise apartment houses, many sold as investment condominiums, some buildings were renovated for adaptive re-use (notably the Tea Building, formerly home to Lipton Tea, and the Machine Shop, home of the Hoboken Historic Museum). Zoning requires that new construction follow the street grid and limits the height of new construction to retain the architectural character of the city and open sight-lines to the river. Downtown, Frank Sinatra Park and Sinatra Drive honor the man most consider to be Hoboken's most famous son, while uptown the name Maxwell recalls the factory with its smell of roasting coffee wafting over town and its huge neon "Good to the Last Drop" sign, so long a part of the landscape. The midtown section is dominated by the serpentine rock outcropping atop of which sits Stevens Institute of Technology (which also owns some, as yet, undeveloped land on the river). At the foot of the cliff is Sybil's Cave (where 19th century day-trippers once came to "take the waters" from a natural spring), long sealed shut, though plans for its restoration are in place. The promenade along the river bank is part of the Hudson River Waterfront Walkway, a state-mandated master plan to connect the municipalities from the Bayonne Bridge to George Washington Bridge and provide contiguous unhindered access to the water's edge and to create an urban linear park offering expansive views of the Hudson with the spectacular backdrop of the New York skyline. As of 2017, the city was considering using eminent domain to take over the last operating maritime industry in the city, the Union Dry Dock.

1970s–present
During the late 1970s and 1980s, the city witnessed a speculation spree, fueled by transplanted New Yorkers and others who bought many turn-of-the-20th-century brownstones in neighborhoods that the still solid middle and working class population had kept intact and by local and out-of-town real-estate investors who bought up late 19th century apartment houses often considered to be tenements. Hoboken experienced a wave of fires, some of which were arson. Applied Housing, a real-estate investment firm, used federal government incentives to renovate "sub-standard" housing and receive subsidized rental payments (commonly known as Section 8), which enabled some low-income, displaced, and disabled residents to move within town. Hoboken attracted artists, musicians, upwardly mobile commuters, and "bohemian types" interested in the socioeconomic possibilities and challenges of a bankrupt New York and who valued the aesthetics of Hoboken's residential, civic and commercial architecture, its sense of community, and relatively (compared to Lower Manhattan) less expensive rents, all a quick, train hop away. Maxwell's (a live music venue and restaurant) opened and Hoboken became a popular place to live.

These trends in development resembled similar growth and change patterns in Brooklyn and downtown Jersey City and Manhattan's East Village—and to a lesser degree, SoHo and TriBeCa—which previously had not been residential. Empty lots were built on, tenements were transformed into luxury condominiums. Hoboken felt the impact of the destruction of the World Trade Center intensely, many of its newer residents having worked there. Re-zoning encouraged new construction on former industrial sites on the waterfront and the traditionally more impoverished low-lying west side of the city where, in concert with Hudson-Bergen Light Rail and New Jersey State land-use policy, transit villages are now being promoted. Once a blue collar town characterized by live poultry shops and drab taverns, it has since been transformed into a town filled with gourmet shops and luxury condominiums.

In October 2012, Hurricane Sandy caused widespread flooding in Hoboken, leaving 1,700 homes flooded and causing $100 million in damage after the storm "filled up Hoboken like a bathtub". Workers in Hoboken had the highest rate of public transportation use in the nation, with 56% commuting daily via mass transit.<ref>Rivera, Ray. "Its Restaurants Empty and Its Trains Stalled, Hoboken Encounters Storm’s Increasing Toll" , The New York Times', December 16, 2012. Accessed August 19, 2020. "According to census surveys, an estimated 56 percent workers here use public transportation every day, surpassing New York City as the most transit-reliant community in the nation."</ref> Hurricane Sandy caused seawater to flood half the city, crippling the PATH station at Hoboken Terminal when more than 10 million gallons of water dumped into the system. In December 2013 Mayor Dawn Zimmer testified before a U.S. Senate Committee on the impact the storm had on Hoboken's businesses and residents,"Mayor Zimmer testifies before Senate on Sandy's impact on Hoboken" , Vimeo, December 13, 2012. Accessed June 2, 2016. and in January 2014 she stated that Lieutenant Governor Kim Guadagno and Richard Constable, a member of governor Chris Christie's cabinet, deliberately held back Hurricane Sandy relief funds from the city in order to pressure her to approve a Christie ally's developmental project,Giambusso, David; and Baxter, Chris. "Hoboken Mayor Dawn Zimmer alleges Chris Christie's office withheld Sandy aid over development deal" , NJ Advance Media for NJ.com, January 18, 2014. Accessed November 12, 2015. a charge that the Christie administration denied.Giambusso, David. "Hoboken Mayor Dawn Zimmer stands by her allegations against Christie" , The Star-Ledger, January 18, 2014. Accessed September 1, 2015. In June 2014, the United States Department of Housing and Urban Development allocated $230 million to Hoboken as part of its Rebuild by Design initiative, adding levees, parks, green roofs, retention basins and other infrastructure to help the low-lying riverfront city protect itself from ordinary flooding and build a network of features to help Hoboken future-proof itself against subsequent storms.

Geography

Hoboken lies on the west bank of the Hudson River between Weehawken and Union City to the north and Jersey City (the county seat) to the south and west.New Jersey Municipal Boundaries , New Jersey Department of Transportation. Accessed November 15, 2019. Directly across the Hudson River are the Manhattan, New York City neighborhoods of the West Village and Chelsea.

Hoboken is laid out in a grid. North–south streets are named (Washington, Adams, Jefferson, Madison, Monroe, Jackson, Harrison, and Clinton, for example). The numbered streets running east–west start two blocks north of Observer Highway with First Street, with the grid ending close to 16th near Weehawken Cove and the city line. Neighborhoods in Hoboken often have vague definitions making Downtown, Midtown and Uptown subjective. Castle Point (or Stevens Point), The Projects, Hoboken Terminal, and Hudson Tea are distinct enclaves at the city's periphery. As it transforms from its previous industrial use to a residential district, the "Northwest" is a name being used for that part of the city.Baldwin, Carly. "Northwest corner of Hoboken to be studied as a redevelopment zone" , NJ.com, February 18, 2009.

Hoboken's ZIP Code is 07030 and its area code is 201.

Climate
Hoboken's temperatures hover around an average in winter, rising and falling, rather than a consistent pattern with a clear coldest time of year, with minimums occurring in late December and early-mid February, rising and falling repeatedly throughout January.
Just like neighboring New York City, the climate is humid subtropical(Cfa).

Demographics

2010 census

The Census Bureau's 2006–2010 American Community Survey showed that (in 2010 inflation-adjusted dollars) median household income was $101,782 (with a margin of error of +/− $3,219) and the median family income was $121,614 (+/− $18,466). Males had a median income of $90,878 (+/− $6,412) versus $67,331 (+/− $3,710) for females. The per capita income for the city was $69,085 (+/− $3,335). About 9.6% of families and 11.0% of the population were below the poverty line, including 20.7% of those under age 18 and 24.4% of those age 65 or over.

2000 census
As of the 2000 census, there were 38,577 people, 19,418 households, and 6,835 families residing in the city. The population density was 30,239.2 inhabitants per square mile (11,636.5/km2), fourth highest in the nation after neighboring communities of Guttenberg, Union City and West New York. There were 19,915 housing units at an average density of 15,610.7 per square mile (6,007.2/km2). The racial makeup of the city was 80.82% White, 4.26% African American, 0.16% Native American, 4.31% Asian, 0.05% Pacific Islander, 7.63% from other races, and 2.78% from two or more races. Furthermore, 20.18% of the total residents also consider themselves to be Hispanic or Latino.DP-1: Profile of General Demographic Characteristics: 2000 – Census 2000 Summary File 1 (SF 1) 100-Percent Data for Hoboken city, Hudson County, New Jersey , United States Census Bureau. Accessed September 24, 2012.

There were 19,418 households, out of which 11.4% had children under the age of 18 living with them, 23.8% were married couples living together, 9.0% had a female householder with no husband present, and 64.8% were non-families. 41.8% of all households were made up of individuals, and 8.0% had someone living alone who was 65 years of age or older. The average household size was 1.92 and the average family size was 2.73.

In the city the age distribution of the population showed 10.5% under the age of 18, 15.3% from 18 to 24, 51.7% from 25 to 44, 13.5% from 45 to 64, and 9.0% who were 65 years of age or older. The median age was 30 years. For every 100 females, age 18 and over, there were 103.9 males.

The median income for a household in the city as of the 2000 census was $62,550, while the median income for a family was $67,500. Males had a median income of $54,870 versus $46,826 for females. The per capita income for the city was $43,195. 11.0% of the population and 10.0% of families were below the poverty line. Out of the total population, 23.6% of those under the age of 18 and 20.7% of those 65 and older were living below the poverty line.

The city is a bedroom community of New York City, where most of its employed residents work. Based on the 2000 Census Worker Flow Files, about 53% of the employed residents of Hoboken (13,475 out of 25,306) worked in one of the five boroughs of New York City, as opposed to about 15% working within Hoboken.

Economy
The first centrally air-conditioned public space in the United States was demonstrated at Hoboken Terminal. The first Blimpie restaurant opened in 1964 at the corner of Seventh and Washington Streets.Genovese, Peter. "A story about a hero: Blimpie, which started in Hoboken, celebrates 50th anniversary" , The Star-Ledger, April 4, 2014. Accessed December 30, 2014. "They borrowed several thousand dollars from a friend, and 'with a can of paint and hammer and nails' turned a vacant storefront into the first Blimpie, which opened April 4, 1964, on Seventh and Washington in Hoboken." Hoboken is home to one of the headquarters of publisher John Wiley & Sons, which moved from Manhattan in 2002.

According to the New Jersey Department of Labor and Workforce Development, Hoboken's unemployment rate as of 2014 was 3.3%, compared to a 6.5% in Hudson County as a whole. In 2018, Hoboken had an unemployment rate of 2.1%, vs. 3.9% countywide.

A 2014 study showed that Stevens Institute of Technology contributed $117 million to Hoboken's economy in 2014, reflecting the university's nearly $100 million payroll for salaries and wages, as well as other goods and services acquired, construction and off-campus spending by students and visitors. The university is responsible for 1,285 full-time jobs.

Parks and recreation

The four parks were originally laid out within city street grid in the 19th century were Church Square Park, Columbus Park, Elysian Park and Stevens Park. Four other parks that were developed later but fit into the street pattern are Gateway Park, Jackson Street Park, Legion Park and Madison Park.

More recently built parks throughout the city include Pier C, a reconstructed pier accessed by a curving walkway along lower Sinatra Drive. A multi-use sports field called 1600 Park opened in 2013, while the one-acre Southwest Park was completed along Jackson Street and Paterson Avenue in 2017. As of 2019, the city was considering expanding the park to a property across the street.

A two-acre park and public plaza called 7th and Jackson Resiliency Park opened in 2019. It includes a playground, an acre of open lawn space, a new indoor gymnasium, play sculptures, and infrastructure to capture over 450,000 gallons of rainwater to reduce flooding.

Construction of the 5.4-acre Northwest Resiliency Park broke ground in 2019 and will include a great lawn, a stage, a central fountain that can be converted into a seasonal ice skating rink, a pavilion, playgrounds, and a multi-purpose field and basketball basin. The $90 million park features many environmentally friendly features and includes an underground stormwater detention system that can store roughly one million gallons of water to help mitigate flooding. The project is expected to be completed sometime in 2022.

A 2014 renovation to the 14th Street Viaduct near the city's northwest edge saw the creation of several recreational areas underneath the structure that include a dog park, passive recreation areas, and street hockey and basketball courts amid a new cobblestone streetscape.

The Hudson River Waterfront Walkway is a state-mandated master plan to connect the municipalities from the Bayonne Bridge to the George Washington Bridge creating an -long urban linear park and provide contiguous unhindered access to the water's edge. To date, completed segments in Hoboken and the new parks and renovated piers that abut them are at Hoboken Terminal, Pier A, the promenade and bike path from Newark to 5th Streets, Frank Sinatra Park, Castle Point Park, Sinatra Drive to 12th to 14th Streets, New York Waterway Pier, 14th Street Pier, and 14th Street north to southern side of Weehawken Cove. Other segments of river-front held privately are not required to build a walkway until the land is re-developed.

 Arts and culture 
Since 1992, the Hudson Shakespeare Company has been the resident Shakespeare Festival of Hudson County performing a free Shakespeare production for each month of the summer. Since 1998, the group has performed "Shakespeare Mondays" at Frank Sinatra Park (410 Frank Sinatra Drive) as part of their annual Shakespeare in the Park tour. Hoboken is also home to cultural attractions such as Barsky Gallery and creative institutions such as the Hoboken Historical Museum and the Monroe Center.

Annual cultural events
Hoboken has many annual events such as the Frank Sinatra Idol Contest, Hoboken Comedy Festival, Hoboken House Tour, Hoboken International Film Festival, Hoboken Studio Tour, Hoboken Arts and Music Festival, Hoboken (Secret) Garden Tour and Movies Under the Stars. The Hoboken Farmer's Market occurs every Tuesday, June through October. There are also numerous festivals such as the Saint Patrick's Day Parade, Feast of Saint Anthony's, Saint Ann's Feast and the Hoboken Italian Festival.

From the 1960s until 2011, Hoboken was home to the Macy's Parade Studio, which houses many of the floats for the Macy's Thanksgiving Day Parade.Seiler Neary, Kathleen "Ultimate Guide to the Macy's Thanksgiving Day Parade" . TLC. Accessed August 26, 2012. Many Stevens students, alumni, and staff members volunteer in the preparation and piloting of the parade floats. The studio was moved out of Hoboken and into a converted former Tootsie Roll Factory in Moonachie, New Jersey 2011.

Government and public service
Local government

The City of Hoboken is governed within the Faulkner Act (formally known as the Optional Municipal Charter Law) under the mayor-council (Plan D) system of municipal government, implemented based on the recommendations of a Charter Study Commission as of January 1, 1953. The city is one of 71 municipalities (of the 564) statewide that use this form of government. The governing body is comprised of the Mayor and the nine-member City Council. The city council is comprised of three members elected at-large from the city as a whole, and six members who each represent one of the city's six wards. All of the members of the city council are elected to four-year terms of office in non-partisan elections on a staggered basis in odd-numbered years, with the six ward seats up for election together and the three at-large and mayoral seats up for vote two years later.

In July 2011, the city council voted to move municipal elections from May to November. The first shifted election were held in November 2013, with all officials elected in 2009 and 2011 having their terms extended by six months.

, the mayor of Hoboken is Ravinder Bhalla, whose term of office ends December 31, 2025. Members of the city council are Council President Michael Russo (2023; 3rd Ward), Council Vice President Emily Jabbour (2025; at-large), Phil Cohen (2023; 5th Ward), Michael DeFusco (2023; 1st Ward), James J. Doyle (2025; at-large), Tiffanie Fisher (2023; 2nd Ward), Jennifer Giattino (2023; 6th Ward), Joe Quintero (2025; at-large) and Ruben J. Ramos Jr. (2023; 4th Ward).2021 Municipal User Friendly Budget , City of Hoboken. Accessed April 16, 2022.General Election November 2, 2021 Official results , Hudson County, New Jersey, updated November 17, 2021. Accessed January 1, 2022.

In the 2017 general election, Ravinder Bhalla was elected to succeed Dawn Zimmer becoming the state's first Sikh mayor; Zimmer had chosen not to run for re-election to a third term and had endorsed Bhalla for the post. Bhalla's running mates, incumbents James Doyle and Emily Jabbour, won two of the at-large seats, while the third seat was won Vanessa Falco who had been aligned with the slate of mayoral candidate Michael DeFusco.Hudson County General Election 2017 Statement of Vote November 7, 2017, Hudson County, New Jersey Clerk, updated November 17, 2017. Accessed January 1, 2018. Zimmer had been the city council president and first took office as mayor on July 31, 2009, after her predecessor, Peter Cammarano, was arrested on allegations of corruption stemming from a decade-long FBI operation. Zimmer, who lost a June 9, 2009, runoff election to Cammarano by 161 votes, served as acting mayor until winning a special election to fill the remainder of the term on November 3, 2009. She was sworn in as mayor on November 6 as is the first female mayor of Hoboken. Zimmer won re-election in November 2013 to a second term of office and began her second term in January 2014.

Federal, state, and county representation

Hoboken is located in the 8th Congressional District and is part of New Jersey's 33rd state legislative district.2019 New Jersey Citizen's Guide to Government , New Jersey League of Women Voters. Accessed October 30, 2019.

 

 Hudson County Board of County Commissioner District 5 comprises Hoboken and parts of the Heights in Jersey City and is represented by Anthony Romano.Anthony Romano . Hudson County, New Jersey. Accessed September 1, 2015.

Politics
As of March 2011, there were a total of 35,532 registered voters in Hoboken, of which 14,385 (40.5%) were registered as Democrats, 3,881 (10.9%) were registered as Republicans and 17,218 (48.5%) were registered as Unaffiliated. There were 48 voters registered to other parties.

In the 2012 presidential election, Democrat Barack Obama received 66.1% of the vote (14,443 cast), ahead of Republican Mitt Romney with 32.4% (7,078 votes), and Libertarian and Green candidates with 1.5% (325 votes), among the 22,018 ballots cast by the city's 40,209 registered voters (172 ballots were spoiled), for a turnout of 54.8%. In the 2008 presidential election, Democrat Barack Obama received 71.0% of the vote here (17,051 cast), ahead of Republican John McCain with 27.5% (6,590 votes) and other candidates with 0.9% (225 votes), among the 24,007 ballots cast by the city's 38,970 registered voters, for a turnout of 61.6%. In the 2004 presidential election, Democrat John Kerry received 65.0% of the vote here (13,436 ballots cast), outpolling Republican George W. Bush with 33.4% (6,898 votes) and other candidates with 0.5% (161 votes), among the 20,668 ballots cast by the city's 31,221 registered voters, for a turnout percentage of 66.2.

In the 2013 gubernatorial election, Republican Chris Christie received 53.0% of the vote (6,562 cast), ahead of Democrat Barbara Buono with 45.0% (5,565 votes), and other candidates with 2.0% (243 votes), among the 16,331 ballots cast by the city's 41,094 registered voters (3,961 ballots were spoiled), for a turnout of 39.7%. In the 2009 gubernatorial election, Democrat Jon Corzine received 62.3% of the vote here (9,095 ballots cast), ahead of Republican Chris Christie with 29.5% (4,307 votes), Independent Chris Daggett with 4.6% (673 votes) and other candidates with 0.9% (138 votes), among the 14,593 ballots cast by the city's 34,844 registered voters, yielding a 41.9% turnout.

On November 7, 2017, City Councilmember Ravinder Bhalla was elected as mayor, making him the first Sikh mayor in the state's history.

Fire department

The city is protected by the 132 paid firefighters of the city of Hoboken Fire Department (HFD). Established in 1891, the HFD currently operates under the command of a Department Chief, to whom two Deputy Chiefs report. The department reported to 3,352 emergency calls in 2010, arriving in an average of 2.6 minutes from the time the original call was received. The HFD has been a Class 1 rated fire department since 1996 as determined by the Insurance Services Office, one of only three in New Jersey, joining Hackensack and Cherry Hill.Skoufalos, Matt. "Cherry Hill Fire Department Earns Top International Safety Rating; Cherry Hill FD completed a three-year accreditation process to earn an ISO-1 classification, just the third department in the state to do so. It could mean lower insurance rates for residents and businesses." , NJ PEN, September 6, 2016. Accessed November 13, 2019. "The department joins those of Hoboken and Hackensack as the only three Class I-certified fire departments in New Jersey, and the only one in the Delaware Valley to also have CFAI accreditation. Cherry Hill is one of only 130 ISO-1 fire departments in the United States, in which only 234 of an estimated 30,000 departments are accredited." HFD's firehouses, including its fire museum, are listed on the National Register of Historic Places.

The department is part of the Metro USAR Strike Team, which consists of nine North Jersey fire departments and other emergency services divisions working to address major emergency rescue situations.

Fire station locations and apparatus
Fire station and company locations in Hoboken are:New Jersey and National Registers of Historic Places - Hudson County , New Jersey Department of Environmental Protection Historic Preservation Office, updated April 26, 2016. Accessed June 2, 2016.

The Fire Museum is located at 213 Bloomfield Street.About Us , Hoboken Historical Museum. Accessed November 5, 2017.

Emergency medical services

EMS in the city of Hoboken is provided primarily by the members of the Hoboken Volunteer Ambulance Corps (HVAC), which was established in 1971. HVAC is the county's only all-volunteer EMS organization and does not charge for the services it provides. HVAC has seven emergency vehicles, in addition to six bicycles that can be used to provide coverage at outdoor events.

Hoboken University Medical Center, founded in 1863 as St. Mary's Hospital, is a historic hospital and the oldest in continuous operation in the state. It is a community hospital and part of the CarePoint Health System.

Social services
HOPES Community Action Partnership, Incorporated (HOPES CAP, Inc. / HOPES) was established in 1964 under President Lyndon B. Johnson's administration signing the Economic Opportunity Act. The majority of HOPES program participants have incomes below the federal poverty threshold. Services include those for youth enrichment, adults, senior assistance, and early childhood development.

Homelessness in the city is addressed by the Hoboken Homeless Shelter, one of the three homeless shelters in the county. In December 2018, the city of Hoboken installed eight parking meters in high foot-traffic areas, painted orange, to collect donations to benefit homelessness initiatives.

Transportation

 
Hoboken has the highest public transportation use of any city in the United States, with 56% of working residents using public transportation for commuting purposes each day. Hoboken Terminal, located at the city's southeastern corner, is a national historic landmark originally built in 1907 by the Delaware, Lackawanna and Western Railroad. The terminal is the origination/destination point for several modes of transportation and an important hub within the NY/NJ metropolitan region's public transit system.

The number of residents parking on Hoboken streets decreased from 2010 to 2015. Hudson Bike Share, a bicycle sharing system operated by nextbike, opened in October 2015. Amid conflicts with Jersey City, which used Citi Bike, Hoboken ceased using Hudson Bike Share in May 2021, and adopted Citi Bike itself, thus connecting the town's bicycle sharing network with the ones already operating in Jersey City and New York City.

Rail
NJ Transit's Main Line, Bergen County Line, Pascack Valley Line, Montclair-Boonton Line, Morris and Essex Lines and Meadowlands Rail Line terminate at the Hoboken Terminal.

The Hudson-Bergen Light Rail, another NJ Transit subsidiary, has three stations in Hoboken–Hoboken Terminal, 2nd Street and 9th Street-Congress Street.

PATH, a 24-hour subway system operated by the Port Authority, operates from Hoboken Terminal to 33rd Street Manhattan, World Trade Center, and Journal Square.

Water
NY Waterway ferry service makes Hudson River crossings from Hoboken Terminal and 14th Street to Battery Park City Ferry Terminal, Wall Street-Pier 11 and the West Midtown Ferry Terminal in Manhattan.

Surface

New Jersey Transit buses 22, 22X, 23, 64, 68, 85, 87, 89, and 126 terminate at Hudson Place/Hoboken Terminal.Hudson County System Map , NJ Transit. Accessed November 12, 2019.

Academy Bus Lines has a garage in Hoboken, operating most of their NYC services from there.

Taxi service is available for a flat fare within city limits and negotiated fare for other destinations. Zipcar is located downtown at the Center Parking Garage on Park Avenue, between Newark Street and Observer Highway.

Roads and highways

The 14th Street Viaduct connects Hoboken to Paterson Plank Road in Jersey City Heights. Two highway tunnels that connect New Jersey to New York are located close to Hoboken. The Lincoln Tunnel is north of the city in Weehawken. The Holland Tunnel is south of the city in downtown Jersey City.

Air
Hoboken has no airports. Airports which serve Hoboken are operated by the Port Authority of New York and New Jersey. These airports are Newark Liberty International Airport, LaGuardia Airport and John F. Kennedy Airport.

Education
Hoboken has a highly educated population. Based on data from the American Community Survey, it was ranked in 2019 as one of the top 15 most-educated municipalities in New Jersey with a population of at least 10,000, placing first on the list, with 50.2% of residents having bachelor's degree or higher, more than double the 23.4% of residents in New Jersey and 19.1% nationwide who have reached that educational level.

Public schools

Hoboken Public Schools is a school district that serves students in pre-kindergarten through twelfth grade. The district is one of 31 former Abbott districts statewide that were established pursuant to the decision by the New Jersey Supreme Court in Abbott v. Burke which are now referred to as "SDA Districts" based on the requirement for the state to cover all costs for school building and renovation projects in these districts under the supervision of the New Jersey Schools Development Authority.SDA Districts , New Jersey Schools Development Authority. Accessed March 1, 2022.

As of the 2020–21 school year, the district, comprised of five schools, had an enrollment of 3,138 students and 229.0 classroom teachers (on an FTE basis), for a student–teacher ratio of 13.7:1. Schools in the district (with 2020–21 enrollment data from the National Center for Education Statistics) are 
Joseph F. Brandt Elementary School with 529 students in grades K–5, 
Thomas G. Connors Elementary School with 292 students in grades K–5, 
Wallace Elementary School with 594 students in grades K–5, 
Hoboken Middle School with 387 students in grades 6–8 and 
Hoboken High School with 428 students in grades 9–12.School Performance Reports for the Hoboken Public School District, New Jersey Department of Education. Accessed March 28, 2022. Hoboken High School was the 187th-ranked public high school in New Jersey out of 322 schools statewide, in New Jersey Monthly magazine's September 2010 cover story on the state's "Top Public High Schools", after being ranked 139th in 2008 out of 316 schools.

In addition, Hoboken has three charter schools, which are schools that receive public funds yet operate independently of the Hoboken Public Schools under charters granted by the Commissioner of the New Jersey Department of Education. Elysian Charter School serves students in grades K–8, Hoboken Charter School in grades K–12 and Hoboken Dual Language Charter School in grades K–8. In 2018 the New Jersey Department of Education named the Dual Language charter as having one of six "Model Programs" in New Jersey.

Private schools

Private schools in Hoboken include The Hudson School, All Saint's Episcopal Day School, Mustard Seed School and Stevens Cooperative School. Hoboken Catholic Academy, a K-8 Catholic school operated by the Roman Catholic Archdiocese of Newark, was one of eight private schools recognized in 2017 as an Exemplary High Performing School by the National Blue Ribbon Schools Program of the United States Department of Education.

Higher education
Stevens Institute of Technology, which was founded in 1870, is located in the Castle Point section of Hoboken. The university is composed of three schools and one college; the Charles V. Schaefer Jr. School of Engineering and Science, School of Business, School of Systems and Enterprises and the College of Arts and Letters. Total enrollment is more than 6,900 undergraduate and graduate students across all schools. Stevens is home to three national research centers of excellence and joint research programs focusing on healthcare, energy, finance, defense, STEM education and coastal stability. Stevens also owns most of Castle Point, which is the highest point in Hoboken.

Hoboken is also the headquarters of Education Dynamics, a for-profit corporation that markets and enrolls students.

Media

Hoboken is located within the New York media market; most of its daily papers available for sale or delivery. Local, county, and regional news is covered by The Jersey Journal, a daily newspaper long based in nearby Jersey City and now based in Secaucus. The Journal, along with other sister newspapers, operates NJ.com, which includes the blog Hoboken Now. The Hoboken Reporter is part of The Hudson Reporter group of local weeklies. Other weeklies, the River View Observer and the Spanish-language El Especialito also cover local news, as does The Stute, the campus newspaper at Stevens Institute of Technology. Magazines that cover Hoboken include the lifestyle magazine hMAG, which launched in 2009. and The Digest, which covers local restaurants and events.

The production company for the 2009 film Assassination of a High School President was based in Hoboken.

The city has been the home of several filming locations. Elia Kazan's 1954 film On the Waterfront was shot in Hoboken. A wedding scene from the 1997 film Picture Perfect, starring Jennifer Aniston, was filmed at the Elks Club at 1005 Washington Street. The 1998 film Restaurant, starring Adrien Brody was shot there as well. Hoboken is home to Carlo's Bake Shop, which is featured in the TLC reality show Cake Boss. The popularity of the show has resulted in increased business for Carlo's Bake Shop, and increased tourism to the Hoboken area, resulting in both positive and negative reaction from local residents and businesses.

The fourth season of A&E's Parking Wars, which documents the lives and duties of parking enforcement personnel, was filmed in Hoboken, in addition to its usual venues of Detroit and Philadelphia. The ABC Primetime magazine Primetime: What Would You Do? has filmed multiple episodes of their social experiments in Hoboken's shops and restaurants.Henault, Bob. "Construction Workers Harass Woman: What Would You Do?" , ABC News, January 13, 2011. Accessed September 1, 2015. "In light of these startling numbers, ABC News' What Would You Do? rigged hidden cameras on a busy Hoboken, N.J., street corner and hired three male actors to portray construction workers on a coffee break and an actress playing the victim."

The 1989 television series Dream Street'' was set and shot in Hoboken.

Bands from Hoboken include alternative rock pioneers The Bongos and art-rock band Yo La Tengo.

Notable people

See also

Bergen, New Netherland
Gateway Region
Hudson Street

References

Further reading

External links

City of Hoboken Official Website
Historic photos of Hoboken and Hamburg America Line ports

 
1849 establishments in New Jersey
Cities in Hudson County, New Jersey
Faulkner Act (mayor–council)
New Jersey populated places on the Hudson River
Populated places established in 1849
Establishments in New Netherland
Sundown towns in New Jersey
Port cities and towns in New Jersey